Jos Hackforth-Jones is an academic administrator, art historian, author, curator, and lecturer. She is the CEO and Director of Sotheby's Institute of Art - London
She holds an MA from Courtauld Institute of Art, University of London and a BA from the University of Sydney.

References 

Year of birth missing (living people)
Living people
Alumni of the University of London
British academic administrators
British art historians
British curators
British women writers
Sotheby's people
University of Sydney alumni